Santiago Cathedral is a Roman Catholic church in the city of Bilbao. The temple was originally built during the 14th–15th centuries as Bilbao's main parish church, and was only declared cathedral in 1950 when the Roman Catholic Diocese of Bilbao was officially created. Its origins probably date to well before the foundation of the city in 1300, when Bilbao was little more than a small enclave of fishermen.

The temple is consecrated in honor of the apostle Saint James the Great (Santiago in Spanish), by virtue of being a point of transit for the pilgrims that followed the Northern branch of the Way of Saint James.

Architecturally, the present building is a mixture of styles: from the 15th century Gothic  of the cloister and the main vault, where of special interest are the cloister and the beautiful portal that gives access Correo street (Puerta del Angel), to the ostentatious Gothic Revival façade and spire.

A curious custom is the addition of stone carvings of local merchants along the buttresses of the main vault.

It should not be confused with the Cathedral of Santiago de Compostela.

For various reasons, the San Mamés stadium, home of local football team Athletic Bilbao, was referred to as La Catedral several decades prior to the inauguration of Santiago Cathedral. A place of worship is depicted on the club's crest (as in the city coat of arms) but this is the nearby San Antón church and its bridge.

References

External links 
 Information about Santiago cathedral
 Photography of Bilbao cathedral (facade and interior), Flickr

Buildings and structures in Bilbao
Basilica churches in Spain
Tourist attractions in Bilbao
Roman Catholic cathedrals in the Basque Country (autonomous community)
Gothic Revival church buildings in Spain
20th-century Roman Catholic church buildings in Spain
12th-century Roman Catholic church buildings in Spain
13th-century Roman Catholic church buildings in Spain